The New Zealand national cricket team toured the West Indies from February to April 1972 and played a five-match Test series against the West Indies cricket team which was drawn 0–0. New Zealand were captained by Graham Dowling; the West Indies by Garfield Sobers. The tour also featured the maiden first-class match to be played by Bermuda. They played the touring New Zealand team in Hamilton, with the visitors winning by an innings and 31 runs.

Test series

1st Test

2nd Test

3rd Test

4th Test

5th Test

References

External links

1972 in New Zealand cricket
1972 in West Indian cricket
1971-72
International cricket competitions from 1970–71 to 1975
West Indian cricket seasons from 1970–71 to 1999–2000